Marjorie Sagne (born 3 March 1985) is a Swiss former swimmer, who specialized in freestyle events. She is a single-time Olympian (2004), and a six-time Swiss titleholder in the 100 m freestyle.

Sagne qualified for the women's 4 × 100 m freestyle relay, as a member of the Swiss team, at the 2004 Summer Olympics in Athens. Teaming with Dominique Diezi, Seraina Prünte, and Nicole Zahnd in heat two, Sagne swam a second leg and recorded a split of 57.17, but the Swiss women settled only for seventh place and fifteenth overall in a final time of 3:48.61.

In 2006, Sagne made her decision to retire from swimming, citing lack of motivation.

References

1985 births
Living people
Olympic swimmers of Switzerland
Swimmers at the 2004 Summer Olympics
Swiss female freestyle swimmers
Sportspeople from Lausanne
21st-century Swiss women